The Sheffield Industrial Museums Trust (SIMT) is an independent charitable trust based in Sheffield, England, that runs the Sheffield City Council-owned Kelham Island, Abbeydale Industrial Hamlet, and Shepherd Wheel museums.

The trust was created from a partnership between the City Council, Sheffield Hallam University and the Company of Cutlers in Hallamshire as Kelham Island Museum Ltd. in November 1994, and reconstituted as the Sheffield Industrial Museums Trust in 1998 when the City Council passed to them control of the recently closed Abbeydale Industrial Hamlet.

See also
Sheffield Galleries and Museums Trust

External links
Official website

 
1998 establishments in England
Culture in Sheffield
Sheffield Industrial Museums Trust
Charities based in Sheffield
Organizations established in 1998